Sambuor is a khum (commune) of Mongkol Borei District in Banteay Meanchey Province in western Cambodia.

Villages

 Chhnaeum Meas
 Sranal
 La
 Ta Meaeng Pok
 Sambuor
 Doun Loek
 Kbal Krabei
 Srah Chhuk
 Srae Prey
 Chaek Angkar
 Thma Dab

References

Communes of Banteay Meanchey province
Mongkol Borey District